Hair-plates are a type of proprioceptor found in the folds of insect joints. They consist of a cluster of hairs, in which each hair is innervated by a single mechanosensory neuron. Functionally, hair-plates operate as "limit-detectors" by signaling the extreme ranges of motion of a joint.

Structure and Neuron Anatomy 
Hair-plates typically consist of a cluster of individual sensory hairs, in which each hair is innervated by a single sensory neuron (Fig. 1 & 2). The number of sensory hairs can vary across hair-plates as well as the length of hairs within a hair-plate. Hair-plates are often positioned within folds of cuticle, so that hairs are deflected during joint movement. They are located on different body parts, including the legs, neck, and antennae. On the legs of insects, hair-plates are typically found at the proximal joints (i.e. thorax-coxa, coxa-trochanter, and trochanter-femur joints) and vary in number for the front, middle, and hind legs. Unlike the front legs, the number of hair-plates, hairs within each hair-plate, and exact location of hair-plates is not well characterized for the middle and hind legs.

The anatomy of a hair-plate neuron is composed of dendrites that are imbedded within a cuticular hair, an elongated cell body, and an axon that projects into the ventral nerve cord, specifically the intermediate neuropil of the corresponding leg. In the front leg neuropil of Drosophila melanogaster, hair-plate neurons arborize along the ventral surface and send processes dorsally and medially (Fig. 3). Moreover, the neurons of the hair-plates located within the coxa-thorax joint project through the ventral, dorsal, and accessory prothoracic nerves, whereas, the hair-plate neurons elsewhere on the leg project through the prothoracic leg nerve. The morphology of the arbors of specific hair-plate neurons associated with the middle and hind legs remains unknown, along with what nerves they project through.

Function 
Hair-plates function as proprioceptors. The sensory neurons innervating the hair-plate may respond phasically  (rapidly adapting) or tonically (slowly adapting) to deflections of the hairs . Thus, hair-plates can encode the position and movement of adjoining body segments. The projections of  neurons associated with the longer hairs of a hair plate can form direct, mono-synaptic excitatory chemical synapses with motor neurons as well as synapses with interneurons that provide inhibitory input onto motor neurons. Therefore, hair-plates are situated to provide rapid feedback to control the movement of the associated leg. Little is known about the function and synaptic partners of the neurons associated with the smaller hairs. Hair-plate neurons are also involved in the presynaptic inhibition to other proprioceptors.

Role of hair-plates during behavior

Walking 
Hair-plates located at the leg joints provide sensory feedback for the control of walking. In stick insects and cockroaches, the surgical removal of coxa hair-plates alters the extremes of leg movement in such a way that the leg may overstep and collide with the anterior leg. This indicates that proprioceptive signals from these hair-plates limit the forward movement of the leg by signaling the end of swing phase. This “limit-detector” function is similar to that of mammalian joint receptors. Ablating the anterior trochanteral hair-plate on a stick insect leg did not alter the coordination between legs, but rather resulted in that leg being held higher. The hair-plates on the trochanter appear to control the height of the animal, which is likely important for climbing over obstacles and the recovery of walking after unexpected perturbations to the legs. Therefore, hair-plates located at different joints along the leg may have different functions.

Feeding 
The mechanosensory information from hair-plates on the leg also contribute to the regulation of feeding behavior in fruit flies, Drosophila melanogaster. The integration of this mechanosensory information along with olfactory information from antennal neurons control the proboscis extension reflex (PER) in flies. Thus, the sensory input from hair-plates is integrated with the information from other sensory modalities to control behaviors beyond walking.

Posture 
Hair-plates located on the neck (known as the prosternal organ) monitor head position relative to the thorax and provide sensory feedback for the control of head posture. In the blowfly Calliphora, surgical removal of the prosternal organ hairs on one side causes the fly to compensate by rolling the head toward the operated side. These results suggest that the prosternal organ may be involved in gaze stabilization.

Antennal movement 
Hair-plates located on the proximal segments of the antenna (Fig. 4) provide sensory feedback for the control of antennal movement and are thought to play an important role in active sensing, object localization, and targeted reaching movements.

See also 
Chordotonal organ
Campaniform sensilla

References 

Insect anatomy
Sensory receptors